How Far Will You Go? is a Canadian English language documentary television series. How Far Will You Go? premiered on July 1, 2008 at 8:00 p.m. EST on the Canadian digital cable specialty channel, OUTtv. The series was also available in the United States on the pay channel here!

Premise
How Far Will You Go? is a documentary television series that follows a group of gay men who have entered a local modelling competition in Vancouver, British Columbia called Vancouver's Next Gay Top Model. The series takes a behind the scenes look at the competition and while also focusing on the lives of the men who compete in the contest.

External links
 Show page on OUTtv

OutTV (Canadian TV channel) original programming
2008 Canadian television series debuts
2000s Canadian documentary television series
2000s Canadian LGBT-related television series